Tadeusz Grygiel (6 February 1954 – 9 May 2022) was a Polish basketball player. He played shooting guard for Śląsk Wrocław from 1970 to 1983.

Awards
Champion of the PLK (1977, 1979, 1980, 1981)

References

1954 births
2022 deaths
Polish men's basketball players
Śląsk Wrocław basketball players